Roscoe Conkling McCulloch (November 27, 1880March 17, 1958) was a Republican politician from Ohio who served in the United States House of Representatives and U.S. Senate.

Early life and career 
Born in Millersburg, Ohio, McCulloch attended the University of Wooster, Ohio State University and Case Western Reserve University School of Law. He commenced the practice of law in Canton, Ohio, in 1903.

Political career

House of Representatives 
After serving as an assistant prosecutor in Stark County, he ran for the House in 1912. He lost, but won a second bid two years later and served three terms from 1915 to 1921. In 1920, he unsuccessfully sought the Republican nomination for governor.

Senate 
He was appointed to the U.S. Senate on November 5, 1929, to fill the vacancy created by the death of Theodore E. Burton. He lost a special election on November 30, 1930, to Robert J. Bulkley to fill out the remainder of the term.

See also

 Election Results, U.S. Representative from Ohio, 16th District
 Election Results, U.S. Senator from Ohio

External links 

1880 births
1958 deaths
Ohio State University alumni
College of Wooster alumni
Case Western Reserve University School of Law alumni
People from Millersburg, Ohio
Republican Party United States senators from Ohio
Politicians from Canton, Ohio
20th-century American politicians
Lawyers from Canton, Ohio
20th-century American lawyers
Republican Party members of the United States House of Representatives from Ohio